Khamis Eid Rafee Thani (born 20 October 1966) is a Bahraini football defender who played for Bahrain in the Asian Cup.

References

External links
Profile at 11v11.com

Living people
Bahraini footballers
Association football defenders
Bahrain international footballers
Footballers at the 1994 Asian Games
Asian Games competitors for Bahrain
1988 AFC Asian Cup players
1966 births